Priognathus is a genus of dead log beetles in the family Pythidae. There is one described species in Priognathus, P. monilicornis.

References

Further reading

 
 

Tenebrionoidea
Articles created by Qbugbot